Norris Goff (May 30, 1906 – June 7, 1978) was an American comedian in radio and film best known for his portrayal of Abner Peabody on the rural comedy Lum and Abner.

Biography
Nicknamed "Tuffy," Goff was born in Cove, Arkansas, but soon moved to Mena, Arkansas where he met his longtime friend and partner Chester Lauck (Lum) and graduating from Mena High School in 1924.  Despite their fame as backwoodsmen, both actors graduated from the University of Arkansas, where Goff became a member of the Sigma Chi fraternity.

Goff and his partner had experience as blackface entertainers, but had also worked up a hillbilly skit based on their own life experiences and friends. Performing on local radio, they soon landed their own network series in 1931. In addition to playing the role of the likable but naive, checker-playing Abner (who worked with Lum at the "Jot 'Em down Store" in fictitious Pine Ridge), Goff co-wrote the earliest episodes with Lauck, and played many of the other recurring characters, including postmaster Dick Huddleston (named after a real life friend in Mena), con-man Squire Skimp, Mousy Gray, and in the sentimental annual Christmas show, Doc Miller.

Goff and Lauck also guest starred as Lum and Abner on radio series such as Bing Crosby's Kraft Music Hall; Goff also made a handful of solo appearances, notably guesting as the father of Andy Devine in an episode of The Jack Benny Program. Goff reprised his role as Abner for seven films between 1940 and 1956. Unlike Lauck, who virtually retired outside of playing Lum, Goff continued to make occasional guest appearances on television in the 1960s. Goff appeared in one episode apiece of two situation comedies with rural themes: Gomer Pyle, U.S.M.C. (as Gomer's grandfather) and The Andy Griffith Show (playing a local storekeeper).

Upon retirement he lived in Palm Springs, California. He died of a stroke at the age of 72 in Palm Desert, California.

Filmography

References

External links

 

1906 births
1978 deaths
People from Mena, Arkansas
American male comedians
American male film actors
American male radio actors
American male television actors
Male actors from Arkansas
People from Palm Desert, California
Male actors from Palm Springs, California
University of Arkansas alumni
20th-century American male actors
Comedians from California
20th-century American comedians